The Victorian Telecommunications Museum was a small museum in the Hawthorn Telephone Exchange, Burwood Road, Hawthorn, Victoria, Australia. It housed historical telecommunications equipment that had been used by what originally was called the Postmaster-General's Department. The Department split in 1975 into Telecom Australia and Australia Post. In 1993 Telecom Australia was renamed Telstra after the merger of Telecom Australia and OTC (Overseas Telecommunications Corporation).

A fraction of the thousands of items housed were on display for visitors. One was a working mini telephone exchange with four old phones that could call each other. The visitor watched the exchange manually step up and click around as the numbers are dialled. The phones had all the original dial tones and rings that were standard for this equipment.

The exhibits included one of the original mechanical speaking clocks, made with rotating glass discs. This was one (number 2) of the four Mark II machines produced in England for use in Australia, which were received in Australia in the early 1950s. The discs were originally read using an exciter and a detector made with valve technology. These devices are no longer available and, because all the originals had failed, replacements had to be fashioned using digital technology adapted to plug into the original valve sockets. This development has enabled the speaking clock to be restored to full operation.

The museum was managed by volunteers and closed at the end of 2019.

A Mark II speaking clock is still on display at the Telstra Museum, Bankstown Sydney, 12 Kitchener Parade, next to the Bankstown Telephone Exchange, which is open to the public every Tuesday and Wednesday. This museum also is run by volunteers.

The Brisbane Telstra Museum is at Albion Telephone Exchange, at the corner of Sandgate and Oriel Streets, Albion. Volunteers also run this site, which is open to the public every Wednesday.

References

External links
 
 The Postal-Telecommunications Historical Society of Queensland Inc.

Museums in Melbourne
History of telecommunications in Australia
Telephone museums
History of science and technology in Australia
Buildings and structures in the City of Boroondara